The Cathedral Basilica of St. Demetrius  (Croatian: Rimokatolička crkva Svetog Dimitrija) also called Sremska Mitrovica Cathedral is the name given to a religious building affiliated with the Catholic Church which is located in the city of Sremska Mitrovica in northern part of European country of Serbia.

The cathedral follows the Roman or Latin rite and is the seat of the Diocese of Srijem (Dioecesis Sirmiensis or Srijemska biskupija) which was created in the fourth century and was restored by Pope Gregory IX in 1229.

The current church was built in 1810 and dedicated on June 30 of that year to St. Demetrius, patron of the city. It was elevated to the status of co-cathedral in 1984, and a minor basilica in 1991. With the restoration of the Diocese of Srijem in 2008, the church was elevated to cathedral.

See also
List of Catholic basilicas
Roman Catholicism in Serbia
St. Demetrius Sveti Dimitrije

References

Roman Catholic cathedrals in Serbia
Buildings and structures in Sremska Mitrovica
Roman Catholic churches completed in 1810
Basilica churches in Serbia
19th-century Roman Catholic church buildings in Serbia